Dale Ford (born 16 December 1991) is a Welsh rugby union player. A winger, he plays club rugby for the Welsh team the Carmarthen Quins having previously played for Llaneli and Neath.

External links
 Scarlets profile

References 

Welsh rugby union players
Scarlets players
1991 births
Living people
Rugby union players from Swansea
Rugby union fullbacks
Rugby union wings